The St. Stanislaus Church Historic District is a  Polish American historic district in Warsaw, North Dakota, United States, that was listed on the National Register of Historic Places in 1979.

The St. Stanislaus Church was designed by John W. Ross and was dedicated in 1901.

As of 1979, the historic district included three contributing buildings: the St. Stanislaus Church, a rectory, and St. Anthony Academy, and one contributing site, a cemetery.

References

External links

Geography of Walsh County, North Dakota
Gothic Revival church buildings in North Dakota
Polish-American culture in North Dakota
Churches on the National Register of Historic Places in North Dakota
Churches in the Roman Catholic Diocese of Fargo
Historic districts on the National Register of Historic Places in North Dakota
National Register of Historic Places in Walsh County, North Dakota
1901 establishments in North Dakota